HMS Rosalind was an  destroyer which served with the Royal Navy. The ship was launched by Thornycroft on 14 October 1916 as the first of five similar ships ordered from the yard. The design was used as the basis for five subsequent ships of the  also built by the company. Rosalind served as part of the Grand Fleet during the First World War, operating as an escort to other warships and in anti-submarine patrols alongside other destroyers. The vessel was sold to be broken up on 13 July 1926.

Design and development

Rosalind was the first of three  destroyers ordered by the British Admiralty from John I. Thornycroft & Company in July 1915 as part of the Sixth War Construction Programme. The ships differed from the six preceding  built by the yard in having all geared turbines and the aft gun being raised on a bandstand.

Displacement was  normal and  full load. Three funnels were fitted.

Armament consisted of three QF 4in Mk IV guns on the ship's centreline, with one on the forecastle, one aft on a raised bandstand and one between the second and third funnels. A single 2-pounder (40 mm) pom-pom anti-aircraft gun was carried, along with four  torpedoes in two twin rotating mounts. The vessel had a complement of 82 officers and ratings.

Construction and career
Rosalind was laid down in October 1915 and launched on 14 October 1916. On commissioning in December 1916, the ship joined the Grand Fleet, initially joining the Thirteenth Destroyer Flotilla. However, within a month, Rosalind had moved and served until the end of the war as part of the Fifteenth Destroyer Flotilla. Between 15 and 24 June 1917, the flotilla took part in anti-submarine patrols east of the Shetland Islands. Rosalind did not sight any submarines, but out of the 117 ships that sailed the route to and from Scandinavia, four were sunk during the operation. Rosalind was transferred to form part of the defence of the Irish Coast during December, serving in that capacity into 1918.

Having been paid off earlier in the year, the vessel was re-commissioned on 15 December 1919, with a reduced complement. Rosalind subsequently formed part of the local defence flotilla for Portsmouth under the cruiser . However, in 1923, the Navy decided to systematically scrap many of the older destroyers in preparation for the introduction of newer and larger vessels. Rosalind was one of those deemed to have reached the end of life and so was sold to King of Garston, Liverpool, to be broken up on 13 July 1926.

Legacy
Rosalind was the prototype for not only three similar R class destroyers built by Thornycroft, but also the five  destroyers built by the same yard, including two that served with the Royal Canadian Navy. These were termed Modified Rosalinds. The name Rosalind was reused by the Shakespearian-class trawler HMT Rosalind that was a founding member of the Royal East African Navy.

Pennant numbers

References

Citations

Bibliography

 
 
 
 

 
 
 
 
 
 

1916 ships
R-class destroyers (1916)
Ships built in Southampton
World War I destroyers of the United Kingdom
Ships built by John I. Thornycroft & Company